1983 in sports describes the year's events in world sport.

Alpine skiing
 Alpine Skiing World Cup:
 Men's overall season champion: Phil Mahre, United States
 Women's overall season champion: Tamara McKinney, United States

American football
 Super Bowl XVII – the Washington Redskins (NFC) won 27–17 over the Miami Dolphins (AFC)
Location: Rose Bowl
Attendance: 103,667
MVP: John Riggins, RB (Washington)
 January 3 – Tony Dorsett sets NFL record for longest run from scrimmage by rushing for 99 yard touchdown.
 January 26 – death of Paul "Bear" Bryant, noted college football coach
 Sugar Bowl (1982 season):
 The Penn State Nittany Lions won 27-23 over the Georgia Bulldogs to win the college football national championship
 Michigan Panthers win United States Football League Championship, 24-22 over Philadelphia Stars
 October 31 – death of George Halas, Chicago Bears founder and coach

Artistic gymnastics
 World Artistic Gymnastics Championships –
 Men's all-around champion: Dmitry Bilozerchev, USSR
 Women's all-around champion: Natalia Yurchenko, USSR
 Men's team competition champion: China
 Women's team competition champion: USSR

Association football
 World Club Championship – Grêmio (Brazil) 2-1  Hamburger SV (Germany)
 UEFA Champions League – Hamburg 1-0  Juventus
 Copa Libertadores de América – Two legs; 1st leg Peñarol 1-1 Grêmio; 2nd leg Grêmio 2-1 Peñarol; Grêmio won 3-2 on aggregate
 UEFA Cup – Two legs; 1st leg Anderlecht 1-0  Benfica; 2nd leg Benfica 1-1 Anderlecht; Anderlecht won 2-1 on aggregate
 Cup Winners' Cup – Aberdeen 2-1 Real Madrid (AET)
 Super Cup – Two legs; 1st leg Hamburg 0-0 Aberdeen; 2nd leg Aberdeen 2-0 Hamburg; Aberdeen won 2-0 on aggregate
 England - FA Cup – Manchester United won 2 - 2 (aet); 4 - 0 (replay) over Brighton & Hove Albion
 FIFA decided to give to Mexico the right to host the Football World Cup 1986 after Colombia announced the reject to celebrate the event.
 Scotland – Dundee United won the First Division for the first time in their history. They won the league at their rivals home ground Dens Park of Dundee.

Athletics
 January 18 – International Olympic Committee (IOC) restores medals to the family of Jim Thorpe
 February 27 – Ireland's Eamonn Coghlan sets a new World Indoor Record for the mile, clocking 3:49.78 at East Rutherford in New Jersey
 August 7 – 14 – The inaugural World Championships in Athletics are held in Helsinki, Finland

Australian rules football
 Victorian Football League
 July 23 – Fitzroy with 12.6 (78) and St. Kilda with 7.1 (43) kick a record quarter aggregate of 19.7 (121) during the second quarter.
 August 5 – ’s Kevin Bartlett became the first player to play 400 VFL games against . Only Michael Tuck, Brent Harvey and Dustin Fletcher have since equalled his achievement.
 Hawthorn wins the 87th VFL Premiership, beating Essendon 20.20 (140) to 8.9 (57)
 Brownlow Medal awarded to Ross Glendinning (North Melbourne)

Baseball
 January 12 – Brooks Robinson and Juan Marichal are elected to the Hall of Fame. Robinson, winner of 16 straight Gold Glove Awards and hero of the 1970 World Series, becomes the 14th player elected in his first year of eligibility. Marichal, the winningest Latin American pitcher in major league history, won 20 or more games six times and had an ERA of 2.50 or less six times.
 World Series – Baltimore Orioles win their most recent World Series 4 games to 1 over the Philadelphia Phillies

Basketball
 NCAA Men's Basketball Championship –
 North Carolina State wins 54-52 over Houston
 NCAA Women's Division I Basketball Championship
 University of Southern California(USC) wins 69–67 over Louisiana Tech
 NBA Finals – Philadelphia 76ers won 4 games to 0 over the Los Angeles Lakers
 National Basketball League (Australia) Finals:
 Canberra Cannons defeated the West Adelaide Bearcats 75–73 in the final.
 Philippine Basketball League, as predecessor for PBA Developmental League, first officially game held on May 6.

Boxing
 May 31 – death of Jack Dempsey, former world heavyweight champion
 May 20 – for the first time ever, two world Heavyweight champions defend their titles the same night, at the same place: Larry Holmes retains the WBC title defeating future two time world champion Tim Witherspoon, and Michael Dokes retains his WBA title with a 15-round draw (tie) against former world champion Mike Weaver.
 June 16 – Roberto Durán wins his third world title, knocking out WBA world Jr. Middleweight champion Davey Moore in eight rounds.
 November 10 – Marvin Hagler retains his unified world Middleweight title with a 15-round unanimous decision over Roberto Durán. It was 1983's most anticipated bout.

Canadian football
 Grey Cup – Toronto Argonauts won 18–17 over the B.C. Lions
 Vanier Cup – Calgary Dinos won 31–21 over the Queen's Golden Gaels

Cricket
 Cricket World Cup – India beat West Indies by 43 runs. Yessir
 Asian Cricket Council formed.

Cycling
 Giro d'Italia won by Giuseppe Saronni of Italy
 Tour de France – Laurent Fignon of France
 UCI Road World Championships – Men's road race – Greg LeMond of the United States

Dogsled racing
 Iditarod Trail Sled Dog Race Champion –
 Rick Mackey won with lead dogs: Preacher & Jody

Field hockey
 Men's European Nations Cup held at Amstelveen won by the Netherlands
 Men's Champions Trophy held at Karachi won by Australia
 Pan American Games (Men's Competition) held in Caracas won by Canada
 Women's World Cup held in Kuala Lumpur won by the Netherlands

Figure skating
 World Figure Skating Championships –
 Men's champion: Scott Hamilton, United States
 Ladies’ champion: Rosalynn Sumners, United States
 Pair skating champions: Elena Valova & Oleg Vasiliev, Soviet Union
 Ice dancing champions: Jayne Torvill & Christopher Dean, Great Britain

Gaelic Athletic Association
 Camogie
 All-Ireland Camogie Champion: Cork
 National Camogie League: Dublin
 Gaelic football
 All-Ireland Senior Football Championship – Dublin 1-10 died Galway 1-8
 National Football League – Down 1-8 died Armagh 0-8
 Ladies' Gaelic football
 All-Ireland Senior Football Champion: Kerry
 National Football League: Kerry
 Hurling
 All-Ireland Senior Hurling Championship – Kilkenny 3-18 died Cork 1-13
 National Hurling League – Kilkenny 2–14 beat Limerick 2–12

Golf
Men's professional
 Masters Tournament – Seve Ballesteros
 U.S. Open – Larry Nelson
 British Open – Tom Watson
 PGA Championship – Hal Sutton
 PGA Tour money leader – Hal Sutton ($426,668)
 Senior PGA Tour money leader – Don January ($237,571)
 Ryder Cup – United States won 14½ - 13½ over Europe in team golf.
Men's amateur
 British Amateur – Philip Parkin
 U.S. Amateur – Jay Sigel
Women's professional
 Nabisco Dinah Shore – Amy Alcott
 LPGA Championship – Patty Sheehan
 U.S. Women's Open – Jan Stephenson
 Classique Peter Jackson Classic – Hollis Stacy
 LPGA Tour money leader – JoAnne Carner ($291,404)

Harness racing
 Ralph Hanover wins the United States Pacing Triple Crown races –
 # Cane Pace – Ralph Hanover
 # Little Brown Jug – Ralph Hanover
 # Messenger Stakes – Ralph Hanover
 United States Trotting Triple Crown races –
 # Hambletonian – Duenna
 # Yonkers Trot – Joie De Vie
 # Kentucky Futurity – Power Seat
 Australian Inter Dominion Harness Racing Championship –
 Pacers: Gammalite
 Trotters: Scotch Notch

Horse racing
 February 8 – champion racehorse Shergar is kidnapped from Ballymany Stud, near the Curragh in County Kildare, Ireland. No trace of the horse has ever been found.
Steeplechases
 Cheltenham Gold Cup – Bregawn
 Grand National – Corbiere
Flat races
 Australia – Melbourne Cup won by Kiwi
 Canada – Queen's Plate won by Bompago
 France – Prix de l'Arc de Triomphe won by All Along
 Ireland – Irish Derby Stakes won by Shareef Dancer
 Japan – Japan Cup won by Stanerra
 English Triple Crown Races:
 2,000 Guineas Stakes – Lomond
 The Derby – Teenoso
 St. Leger Stakes – Sun Princess
 United States Triple Crown Races:
 Kentucky Derby – Sunny's Halo
 Preakness Stakes – Deputed Testimony
 Belmont Stakes – Caveat

Ice hockey
 Art Ross Trophy as the NHL’s leading scorer during the regular season: Wayne Gretzky, Edmonton Oilers
 Hart Memorial Trophy for the NHL’s Most Valuable Player: Wayne Gretzky, Edmonton Oilers
 Stanley Cup – New York Islanders win 4-0 over the Edmonton Oilers
 World Hockey Championship –
 Men's champion: Soviet Union defeated Czechoslovakia
 Junior Men's champion: USSR defeated Czechoslovakia

Motorsport

Radiosport
 First European High Speed Telegraphy Championships held in Moscow, Russia.

Rugby league
1983 KB Cup
1983 New Zealand rugby league season
1983 NSWRFL season
1982–83 Rugby Football League season / 1983–84 Rugby Football League season
1983 State of Origin series

Rugby union
 89th Five Nations Championship series is shared by France and Ireland

Snooker
 World Snooker Championship – Steve Davis beats Cliff Thorburn 18-6
 World rankings – Steve Davis becomes world number one for 1983/84

Swimming
 Pan American Games in Caracas, Venezuela

Tennis
 Grand Slam in tennis men's results:
 # Australian Open – Mats Wilander
 # French Open – Yannick Noah
 # Wimbledon championships – John McEnroe
 # U.S. Open – Jimmy Connors
 Grand Slam in tennis women's results:
 # Australian Open – Martina Navratilova
 # French Open – Chris Evert
 # Wimbledon championships – Martina Navratilova
 # U.S. Open – Martina Navratilova
 Davis Cup – Australia won 3-2 over Sweden.

Volleyball
 Asian Volleyball Championships held in Japan: both men's and women's tournaments won by Japan
 European Volleyball Championship held in East Germany won by USSR (men) and DDR (women)
 Volleyball at the 1983 Pan American Games held in Caracas won by Brazil (men) and Cuba (women)

Water polo
 1983 FINA Men's Water Polo World Cup held in Malibu, California won by USSR
 Men's competition at Pan American Games in Caracas won by USA
 1983 FINA Women's Water Polo World Cup held in Sainte-Foy, Quebec City, Canada, won by the Netherlands

Yacht racing
 Australia II, of the Royal Perth Yacht Club, wins the America's Cup over Liberty, from the New York Yacht Club, 4 races to 3; the victory breaks a 132-year winning streak by the NYYC through 25 Cup challenges, the longest-running unbeaten streak in all of sports

Multi-sport events
 Ninth Pan American Games held in Caracas, Venezuela
 Ninth Mediterranean Games held in Casablanca, Morocco
 Twelfth Summer Universiade held in Edmonton, Alberta, Canada
 Eleventh Winter Universiade held in Sofia, Bulgaria

Awards
 Associated Press Male Athlete of the Year – Carl Lewis, Track and field
 Associated Press Female Athlete of the Year – Martina Navratilova, Tennis

References

 
Sports by year